The Buffalo mayoral election of 1993 took place on November 4, 1993 and resulted in local politician Anthony Masiello winning a first term as mayor after Jimmy Griffin had resigned against two other opponents.

References

1993 New York (state) elections
Buffalo
Mayoral elections in Buffalo, New York